Marta Paoletti (born 13 April 1981 in Milan) is a former ice dancer who represented Italy.  With partner Alessandro Tormena, she finished third at the Italian Figure Skating Championships in 2000.  She later teamed up with Fabrizio Pedrazzini and finished second at the Italian Nationals in 2003.  That same year, she and Pedrazzini finished 18th at the European Figure Skating Championships.

External links 
 

1981 births
Living people
Sportspeople from Rome
Italian female ice dancers
20th-century Italian women
21st-century Italian women